The Men's Giant Slalom in the 2018 FIS Alpine Skiing World Cup involved eight events, including a parallel giant slalom. Marcel Hirscher of Austria won six of the races this season and easily won the discipline for the fourth straight season, his fifth total win in this discipline, on his way to his seventh straight overall World Cup championship.  Hirscher clinched the victory after winning the next-to-last race of the season in Kranjska Gora, Slovenia.

The season was interrupted by the 2018 Winter Olympics from 12-24 February 2018 at Yongpyong Alpine Centre (slalom and giant slalom) at the Alpensia Sports Park in PyeongChang and at the Jeongseon Alpine Centre (speed events) in Jeongseon, South Korea.  The men's giant slalom was held on 18 February.

Standings 
 

DNS = Did Not Start
DNF1 = Did Not Finish run 1
DSQ1 = Disqualified run 1
DNQ = Did Not Qualify for run 2
DNF2 = Did Not Finish run 2
DSQ2 = Disqualified run 2

Updated at 18 March 2018 after all events.

See also
 2018 Alpine Skiing World Cup – Men's summary rankings
 2018 Alpine Skiing World Cup – Men's Overall
 2018 Alpine Skiing World Cup – Men's Downhill
 2018 Alpine Skiing World Cup – Men's Super-G
 2018 Alpine Skiing World Cup – Men's Slalom
 2018 Alpine Skiing World Cup – Men's Combined

References

External links
 Alpine Skiing at FIS website

Men's Giant Slalom
FIS Alpine Ski World Cup men's giant slalom discipline titles